Maricar may refer to:

 Maricar Reyes, a Filipino actress
 Maricar Balagtas, Miss Universe
 Maricar de Mesa, a Filipino actress
 M. O. Hasan Farook Maricar, a three-time Chief Minister of the Union Territory of Pondicherry